Rope caulk or caulking cord is a type of pliable putty or caulking formed into a rope-like shape. It is typically off-white in color, relatively odorless, and stays pliable for an extended period of time.

Rope caulk can be used as caulking or weatherstripping around conventional windows installed in conventional wooden or metal frames (see glazing). It is also used as a form for epoxy work, since epoxy does not adhere to this material.

Rope caulk has also been applied to the metallic structure supporting the magnet for a dynamic speaker to cut unwanted resonance of the metal structure, leading to improved speaker performance. It has also been used as a sonic damping material in sensitive phonograph components.

History

Mortite brand rope caulk was introduced by the J.W. Mortell Co. of Kankakee, Illinois in the 1940s, and called "pliable plastic tape". The trademark application was filed in March, 1943. It was later marketed as "caulking cord". The company was later acquired by Thermwell Products.

Mortite

Mortite putty is a brand of rope caulk marketed under the Frost King brand. Its primary ingredient is titanium dioxide; it has a specific gravity of 1.34.

Notes

Plastics
Building engineering